Two rings, or variations, may refer to:

 2-ring, in mathematics
 "Two Rings", a 2011 song by Ice Choir from the 2012 album Afar
 a type of ring binder
 Bicyclic molecule, two-ringed molecule
 Heterocyclic compounds, 2-ring

See also
 Two Ring Circus (disambiguation)
 Ring Ring (disambiguation)
 Ring 2 (disambiguation)
 Ring (disambiguation)
 2nd Ring Road, in Beijing